"Soul Standing By" is a song by Billy Idol from his 1986 studio album Whiplash Smile. It was released as a single in Australia and New Zealand and was a top 20 hit in the latter.

Charts

References

External links 
 "Soul Standing By" at Discogs

1986 songs
1987 singles
Billy Idol songs
Songs written by Billy Idol
Festival Records singles
Chrysalis Records singles